Wang Liang may refer to:

Wangliang, a demon in Chinese mythology
Wang Liang (footballer, born 1979) (born 1979), Chinese footballer
Wang Liang (footballer, born 1989) (born 1989), Chinese footballer
Liang Wang (oboist) (born 1980), Chinese-American oboist

See also
Liang Wang (disambiguation)